Special Female Force is a 2016 Hong Kong action comedy film directed by Wilson Chin and starring Eliza Sam, Joyce Cheng and Tong Bing Yu.

Plot
After her mother was killed during a mission twenty years ago in Thailand, Fa (Eliza Sam) decides to join the police academy in Hong Kong where she meets 5 new friends played by Anita Chui, Cathryn Lee, Mandy Ho, Joyce Cheng and Jeana Ho. Failing to graduate, the six women are given the opportunity to join a formerly disbanded all-female elite force to hunt down terrorist Gu Zhi Jin, the man who killed Fa's mother. The group of female agents led by a friend of Fa's mother go undercover in Malaysia.

Cast
The six members of the special force:
 Eliza Sam
 Anita Chui
 Cathryn Lee
 Mandy Ho
 Joyce Cheng
 Jeana Ho

Supporting Cast
 Chris Tang
 Jacky Cai
 Tong Bing Yu
 Stephy Tang
 Aaron Aziz
 Jessica Cambensy

References

External links
 
 

2010s Cantonese-language films
Hong Kong action films
2016 films
2010s Hong Kong films